Chalad is a town which is near to Kannur city in Kerala state, South India. It is part of the Kannur Municipal Corporation.

Location
It is located on the route that runs from Kannur city to Azhikode, and it is one of the shortest ways to Mangalore highway from Kannur.

Tourism
Kerala's Payyambalam beach is a major tourist attraction in this region. There are four A class theaters in Chalad.  It is also the biggest part of Kannur city. Chalad Sree Dharma Shastha temple is one of the most sacred and old Aiyyappa Temples in Kerala.  There is also one of the biggest mosques in Kannur. This area also bears a posh residential area for Kannur. Chalad is the political hub of Kannur city.

Transportation
Chalad town is located in Kannur- Alavil-Azhikode road. This town is the busiest stretch on this road. This road connects Kannur city towards Azhikkal Port. Chalad town is connected towards National Highway via Chalad-Pannanpara road. This Highway connected towards Mangalore, Goa and Mumbai can be accessed on the northern side and Kozhikode, Cochin and Thiruvananthapuram can be accessed on the southern side. The nearest railway station are Chirakkal railway station and Kannur Railway Station on Mangalore-Palakkad line. 
Trains are available to almost all parts of India subject to advance booking over the internet.  There are airports at Mattanur, Mangalore and Calicut. All of them are international airports but direct flights are available only to Middle Eastern countries.

Image gallery

See also
 Kannur district
 Pallikkunnu
 Payyambalam
 Azhikode

Suburbs of Kannur